Breakwater Resources was a mining company based in Toronto, Ontario, Canada. On August 26, 2011 the company was acquired by Nyrstar.

Mines

Operations
Breakwater operated six mines:
Myra Falls mine in British Columbia
Langlois mine in Quebec
El Mochito mine in Honduras
El Toqui mine in Chile
Nanisivik Mine closed in 2002
Bouchard-Hebert mine closed in 2005

References

Mining companies of Canada